Prometheus Radio Project v. FCC, was a series of cases heard and adjudicated by the U.S. Third Circuit Court of Appeals from 2003 to 2010. A civilian activist group, Prometheus Radio Project, challenged new media ownership rules put forth by the Federal Communications Commission (FCC) during its 2002 Biennial Review. The majority ruled 2-1 to throw out the attempt by the FCC to raise the limits of cross-ownership of media, and determined that a "diversity index" used by the FCC to weigh cross-ownership (of radio, television and newspapers) employed several "irrational assumptions and inconsistencies." Many elements were remanded to be fixed or better explained to assure they were in the public interest. The dissenting opinion by Chief Judge Anthony Joseph Scirica contested that the majority were simply employing their own assumptions, and that the FCC should be allowed to use its mandated expertise and make adjustments as necessary. The Court also ruled that section 202 (h) of the Telecommunications Act of 1996 did not contain a "deregulatory presumption," and that the burden rested with those seeking to modify or eliminate the existing rules.

The FCC was ordered to reconfigure how it justifies raising ownership limits, and after the Supreme Court later turned down an appeal, the decision stood.	In 2010, the Third Circuit Court of Appeals revisited the case once again, following changes made by the FCC, and lifted the stay of the new rules, allowing the agency to move forward with increases in media-ownership limits.

Prior history of media ownership rules

2002 Biennial review and 2003 report and order
As required by changes made in the Telecommunications Act of 1996, the FCC undertook its 2002 biennial review of current media ownership rules. During this evaluation, followed by publication in the 2003 Report and Order, the FCC decided to amend the current set of rules. Under Chairman Michael Powell, the Commission sought to significantly relax media ownership regulations. The two main priorities of localism and diversity were retained.

Cross ownership 
The FCC decided to eliminate the two separate limits on ownership of different media outlets in local markets, and replace them with one multi-tiered rule. Considering the old rule prohibiting common ownership of a broadcast television station and a newspaper in the same market, and the rule limiting the amount of television and radio station cross-ownership depending on the size of the market, the FCC instituted a new three tier cross-ownership rule. In small markets, cross-ownership is prohibited. In mid-sized markets an entity can own a newspaper and either (a) one television station and 50% of radio stations, or (b) up to 100% of the radio stations. In large markets, cross ownership is unrestricted.

The FCC determined this change was the best course of action for four reasons. 1) advertisers do not consider newspapers and television as close substitutes. 2) the previous ban did not allow efficient combinations that resulted in high –quality products that ultimately supported localism. The element of localism, one in which the FCC deemed vital to public interest, was shown through statistics and empirical examples of grandfathered television stations owned by newspapers. On average, these stations had much more local content in their television news than their competitors. They also were shown to have higher quality, as judged through consumer support (ratings) and industry support (broadcasting excellence awards) 3) The FCC did not believe that it had enough evidence that ownership affected view point to the degree that a blanket ban was required. 4) The presence of other media, such as cable and internet, adequately fill the void for view point lost due to consolidation.

Diversity index 
The FCC created this tool to help identify markets where cross-ownership limits should be retained. The index was based on the Herfindahl-Hirschman Index (HHI), which is used by the Federal Trade Commission and Department of Justice to measure market concentration. It is commonly used to assess a merger's effect on competition in a market. HHI is calculated by summing the squares of each firm's share of a given market. Therefore, a highly competitive market will have a lower score. Included in the Diversity Index are broadcast television, newspapers, radio, and internet. Based purely on popularity of each media source, the FCC assigned broadcast TV 33.8%, newspapers 20.2%, weekly periodicals 8.6%, radio 24.9%, cable internet 2.3%, and all other internet 10.2%. Within each media type, the number of outlets were assigned an equal market share. The summation of all media types for each owner was then squared and added to the index. Scores were determined for all markets with five or fewer television stations, all markets with 15 to 20 television stations, and ten randomly selected markets with between six and ten stations. The FCC then considered what would happen to scores under different ownership limit scenarios. In small sized markets, scores dramatically increased, showing the need for greater control. Due to events of the eventual court case, the Diversity Index never went into effect.

Local television ownership rule
The FCC modified local television ownership rules to allow tri-ownership in markets of 18 stations or more, and duo-ownership in all other markets, subject to a restriction on a combination of any of the four largest stations in any market. This change followed from a directive from the Telecommunications Act of 1996, in which Congress directed the FCC to examine its current rules which at the time prohibited common ownership of two stations with overlapping Grade B signal contours, known as the 'Single Market, Single Station Rule'.

Local radio ownership rule
Following a 1992 change in which the FCC abandoned a one-to-a-market limit on radio station ownership, new ownership rules allowed ownership of multiple stations, with the exact number depending on market size, up to 25% of audience share. The Telecommunications Act of 1996 then directed the FCC to further relax ownership limits, allowing up to eight stations in a market (no more than five in the same FM or AM), and to review the rules biennially. Following the 2002 Biennial Review, the FCC decided to change the meaning of 'radio market' from a contour-overlap methodology, to a geography based method used by Arbitron. At the same time as switching to Arbitron Radio Markets, the FCC decided to begin including non-commercial stations when determining the size of the market. These two changes somewhat offset each other, since switching to geography reduced the size of markets, while adding non-commercial stations increased the size, however, on average, the net effect was a slight decrease in market size. In applying these new rules, current ownership configurations that would be found impermissible once new rules took effect were grandfathered their existing ties.

The commission's goal was to create a system of rules that promoted five equal sized competitors in each market. They arrived at this benchmark using Game Theory. Examining this line of economic thinking, it was decided that five equal competitors was the correct amount for optimal competition in a single market.

Prometheus Radio Project
The Prometheus Radio Project was founded in 1998 by activists working within social change movements such as housing, environmentalism, health care, anti-war, and criminal justice reform. Beginning as a group of pirate radio stations, the group of LPFM radio stations worked together to serve local communities with diverse media views. They also pressured the FCC on various issues related to media reform, such as the Prometheus Radio Project v. FCC case. The stated mission of the group is to strengthen communities through media, and to "demystify media policy and technology and advocate for a more just media system." The stated vision involves a free media that does not limit democracy, and puts media in the hands of the people.

Purpose of case
In 2003, the Prometheus Radio Group served as the main petitioners in a case against the FCC, where it brought 2003 FCC changes in media ownership rules to court petitioning for a judicial review, along with several other public interest and consumer advocacy groups. They encouraged the court to send the FCC back to the drawing board with a mandate to: 1) Re-examine the citizen testimony in the earlier proceeding, and open up new comment periods on the issue, including allowing for detailed examination of such issues as the addition of non-commercial stations to voice counts and the ill-conceived 'diversity index'. 2) Expand the scope of the "localism task force" to admit testimony relevant to ownership issues. 3) Clarify that "the dismal science" of economics is not the only empirical basis for examining issues of media policy".

Prometheus wanted to point out that economics could be a very weak reason for making decisions, while "Sociology, anthropology, and other sciences have quantitative and qualitative contributions to make in the policy process. Social problems and goals beyond the economic health of media companies and their advertisers must be considered, and citizens without obvious economic interests in this proceeding should be considered to be stakeholders".

Original Case
On August 22, 2003, the Prometheus Radio Project v. FCC case began in the United States Court of Appeals, Third Circuit as No. 03-3388. Fox Entertainment Group, Fox Television Stations, NBC, Telemundo Communications Group and Viacom all served as intervenors in the case.

Judges Anthony Joseph Scirica, Thomas L. Ambro and Julio M. Fuentes were present for the case, and commented that normally they would adhere strictly to Federal Rule of Appellate Procedure 18, that the petitioner move first before the agency that would stay its order, but in this case it seemed virtually certain that the FCC would not grant a stay in this matter. The court was composed of two judges, Ambro and Fuentes, appointed by Democratic President Bill Clinton, and one judge, Scirica, appointed by Republican President Ronald Reagan.

In court, Prometheus Radio Project requested a stay on the effective date of the FCC's new ownership rules as outlined in the FCC's 2003 Report and Order, and drafted in the 2002 Biennial Regulatory Review, pending judicial review. The alleged harms from great industry consolidation, were argued to be widespread and irreversible if they were allowed to occur, without harm to any parties if status quo was retained.

Extensive oral arguments were heard September 3, leading to the court's decision.

Ruling
The stay was granted, with prior ownership rules ordered to be kept in place, pending a resolution of the proceedings.  In doing so, the court considered four factors: the movant's likelihood of success on the merits; whether or not the movant would suffer irreparable harm if the request is denied; whether third parties will be harmed by the stay; and whether granting the stay will serve the public interest. The granting of the stay was based on the principle in administrative law to order status quo be maintained when a serious question is brought before the court, and little harm will befall other parties, while denial would cause irreparable injury on the movant.

The harm to Prometheus Radio Project absent a stay would include the loss of an appropriate remedy if later the new ownership rules were determined to be invalid. At the same time, the harm to the FCC and other parties was determined to be minimal if a stay was granted. Therefore, the court ordered a judicial review of the merits, and deemed public interest in the outcome important enough to maintain status quo until that time. The stay in no way was the courts opinion siding with Prometheus Radio Group, merely delaying the rules taking effect giving time to be briefed and a resolution to be reached.

Third Circuit of appeals (main case)
On February 11, 2004, arguments began for the judicial review on the regulations in front of the court. A considerable amount of additional petitioners were added to the case on both sides of the issues, citizen petitioners and deregulatory groups. The 2-1 majority opinion was written by Judge Ambro and filed on June 24, 2004. In summation, the court found that the FCC is required to examine its rules, and determine if they are useful and serving the public interest, making adjustments as necessary. However, regardless of what they determine, the FCC must support each decision with a reasoned analysis. The majority found multiple areas in which they deemed FCC decisions irrational, inconsistent, or not well explained. For this reason they remanded these areas back to the FCC, and found in favor of the Prometheus Radio Group, halting the proposed changes in media ownership rules.

Majority opinion
The court evaluated the degree of each decision that the FCC made and determined whether each was based on sound reasoning, was well justified, and properly explained.

I. Mootness and the national television ownership rule
During the period that this case made it to trial, Congress passed the 2004 Consolidated Appropriations Act, which modified the Telecommunications Act of 1996, to change the national audience reach limit for television stations to 39%. Therefore, the challenge to the FCC's decision of raising the national limit from 35% to 45% became moot. UHF discount was a part of this argument, however, in the court's opinion it was considered in Congress' action, though not explicit, and not for the court to question.

II. Cross ownership rules
The court examined the FCC's decision to replace the newspaper/broadcast cross-ownership rules in favor of new cross-media limits. This change had been attacked by groups on both sides, but the court determined that this was within the legal right of the FCC. The court did not, however, uphold the specific limits themselves because in its opinion the FCC did not provide reasoning to support the exact limits that the commission chose.

With regards to the FCC's decision to change to the multi-tiered rules, the court agreed with deregulatory groups that it was no longer in the public interest to have blanket bans, agreeing that these bans hurt localism in the news product. The Court, however, agreed with the FCC that some regulation was still necessary. This is in part because cable and internet were not considered complete substitutes to fill the void of consolidation. The court also dismissed claims that any regulation violated the First or Fifth Amendments.

Diversity index
The court deemed the FCC guilty of making irrational assumptions, and being inconsistent in their formulations of the Diversity Index. In the opinion of the court, the FCC gave too much weight to the internet as a media outlet, and was incorrect to assign outlets of the same media type equal market shares. This led to inconsistent cross-media limits from the Diversity Index results.

Internet weight
The court agreed with the FCC's decision to discount the effect of cable television, due to their concerns that cable does not effectively provide independent local news, but found that it was irrational to not discount the internet in the same manner. The FCC did not identify which websites were used as sources of local news, which was a problem because many of the local news websites were owned by local television stations and newspapers, thus not contributing to diversity.

Same media equal market shares
The court also disagreed with the FCC's assumption of equal market shares within the same type of media. The point was raised that the concept of equal share within the same media type was incongruent with entire approach to the Diversity Index, which assigns different weights to different media types. The court determined that this inconsistency was a problem. Empirical evidence also showed that the equal weight assumption could produce absurd results and comparisons in concentration of media.

Result specific
The court found the specific amounts of ownership allowed to be inconsistent, and impermissible. Some combinations newly allowed caused considerably greater consolidating change in Diversity Index scores than others that were disallowed. The Court found the fact that there was no explanation for the inconsistencies a considerable problem for the new cross-media limits. Therefore, while possessing the right to impose the limits, the FCC did not provide the necessary reasoning for the specific limits chosen, and must do so.

Public notice
The ruling also chastised the FCC for failing to make public the methodology behind the Diversity Index. While the FCC put out notice that it was considering a new metric for determining ownership limits, it never released how it was to be determined or allowed public opinion on the issue. The Court recommended that future metrics be made available before becoming final rule.

III. Local television ownership rule
With regards to the new local television ownership rule, the Courts upheld many of the regulatory changes made. The court agreed with allowing some consolidation by eliminating the "eight voices" rule, agreed with the decision to allow triopolies in large markets, as well as using the top-four station restriction.

The court remanded for the FCC to justify its decision about a new waiver system for failing stations, in which they no longer had to post notice of the station's availability to out-of-market buyers. The majority did not believe that the FCC had adequately described its reasoning for the change, and stated their belief if would hurt minority ownership of media. They asked that along with a detailed explanation, a report on the impact of minority ownership be submitted.

The Court also did not agree with the numerical limits imposed in the ownership. The premise of the equal share assumption was attacked, but its application in determining the situations where duopolies vs. triopolies are permitted created inconsistencies in which markets already saturated past the FCC's stated permissible rate would now legally become even more saturated. The inconsistencies caused by the specific numerical limits caused them to be remanded for reconsideration.

IV. Local radio ownership rule
In the 1950, Petitioners challenged the FCC's change to local radio ownership rules, limiting the number of stations a company may own in different sized markets, as well as retaining specific numerical limits. The court affirmed the decision to change the rules, but remanded the specific numerical limits, since it believed the specific numbers to be arbitrary.

The decision to change the definition of local markets to a geography based system was supported by the Court. Despite attacks that the geography based system shrunk the size of markets, thus reducing the number of stations permitted, as well as that the inclusion of non-commercial stations made markets larger and allowed more stations to be owned, the court determined that the FCC justified its position in both regards, and that their justifications were sufficient.

While the numerical limits for ownership were supported by the court, the fact that they simply retained the existing numerical limits was not. Both sides had issue with this, as the believed that it did not follow the reasoning of other steps the commission took, nor fit the mission of establishing five equal sized ownership groups for competitive reasons. The court remanded this decision, and asked for additional justification. The court also remanded the very thinking of the goal to achieve five equal sized competitors. It agreed both with the deregulation groups that claimed that evidence showed no actual or potential for equal sized competitors, as well as the Citizen Petitioners who showed that five competitors was incongruent with the Department of Justice's definition of competition. Since the FCC had used the DOJ standards to justify the television limits it imposed, it was deemed irrational to then ignore DOJ rules for radio limits.

Finally, the Court agreed with the deregulation petitioners that the FCC failed to adequately support its decision to place AM/FM subcaps. While it makes sense that FM has technological advantages, it does not explain why there is a need for an AM sub-cap at all. The FCC did not respond to this criticism, and the court remanded it for amendment.

V. Conclusion
While the Court affirmed most of the FCC's new rules, several problems were highlighted and remanded due to the FCC's lack of justification, or irrationality behind certain rules. Most notably, the derivation of new Cross-Media limits based on the Diversity Index, and the modification of numerical limits on both local television and radio ownership suffered from the irrational assumption that media outlets of the same type make an equal contribution to diversity and competition, especially the internet.

Dissent by Judge Scirica
The dissenting voice of the court belonged to Judge Scirica. While he concurred with many of majority's rulings, he dissented with the decision to order a stay, vacate the regulations, and remand certain rules to the FCC. It was Scirica's opinion that the court upended the way that judiciary reviews agency rule making, as it was his belief that principles of deference be accorded to agency decision-making. He preferred to allow the FCC's media ownership rules to go into effect, as it is not the Court's role to second guess an agency acting within its delegated authority, and substitute its own policy judgment. He preferred to allow the commission the opportunity to monitor and evaluate its policies so that they can adjust them, and assign accountability to rest with the FCC.

I. Diversity index and cross-media limits
Judge Scirica quotes the earlier FCC v NCCB case in which the Supreme Court ruled that "diversity and its effects are… elusive concepts, not easily defined let alone measured without making qualitative judgments". He also points out that he sides with FCC in that the Diversity Index is not the final rule, nor sole consideration, and as such should be given deference unless specifically shown to be unreasonable. Therefore, any problems with the Diversity Index were insufficient to prevent the FCC rules from taking effect.

II. Weight assigned to internet
Judge Scirica notes the incredible challenges in determining the size and use of the internet. As it continues to rapidly grow, pinpointing exact numbers are very difficult. He does not agree with the premise that only news reported by 'news organizations' is news, and therefore many little groups, shops, and organizations use their websites to post local 'news'. Due to his disagreement on the definition of 'news', and the difficulty overall in pinpointing internet numbers, he does not believe there is sufficient enough proof that the FCC was incorrect in its determination, and as such should be given deference.

III. Equal shares within same media
Scirica admits that equal shares within the same media may not be the perfect methodology, but he points to the great constraints and constant changes that exist in determining market shares for different stations. In light of this point, as well as the difficulties in practice with other methods, he errors on the side of the Commission, and does not find this decision to be arbitrary, capricious, or reason to hold up the implementation of FCC rules. This causes him not to agree with the majority and take issue with either local television ownership rules or local radio ownership rules. He would not grant a stay of these new regulations, and rather believes the FCC should be given the chance to monitor their own policies and make adjustments as necessary.

IV. Conclusion
In conclusion, Judge Scirica noted the authority that the FCC had in this sphere. While not all elements perfect, he believed the Commission must be left to their best judgment, and allow them to take the responsibility to make changes as necessary. In his opinion none of the rules were egregious, or irrational. Therefore, the court should not substitute its own fears and opinions for those of the commission. He would affirm the FCC rules, denying the petitioner's request, and allow the new regulations to take effect immediately.

Impact

Policy questions
The policy question addressed by the court had to with the responsibilities of the FCC when making changes to rules and regulations. The court confirmed that the leading principles of the FCC were to be localism and diversity, as well as the authority to impact an area so vital to the public, and scarce. The impact of the ruling was not that the FCC did not have the right or authority to regulate media ownership limits, but rather than in all cases where status quo is changed, it is the responsibility of the commission to articulate and prove that the changes are in the public interest, through rational analysis and explanation. The benefit of the doubt is given to the status quo, unless an agency can prove that changes result in positive effects for the public interest.

Proving diversity was shown to be difficult because it is inherently different from welfare or efficiency. As Johannes Bauer and Steven Wildman noted in the Federal Communications Law Journal, "By no stretch of the imagination could it be said that new ownership policies were produced through application of a welfare calculus employed to identify new policy optima. The calculus simply did not exist. While the definition of economic surplus that would presumably be central to the efficiency component of such a calculus was conceptually clear and in principle measurable, the same could not be said for diversity." The problem is that diversity is not a clear concept, and therefore difficult to prove.

Opinions
The Media Access Project, one of the additional petitioners in the case, summed up the victory as the court "effectively deciding that preserving democracy is more important than helping big media companies grow bigger." They viewed it as a directly impacting people's First Amendment rights to freely express themselves and the views of their communities through local and national media outlets."

According to Aaron Perzanowski of the Berkeley Law Review, the case points to the need for Congress to step up its role in disputes of regulation. Rather than delegate the decisions to agencies and commissions, Congress needs to reassert itself as the final arbiter of media policy. Perzanowski bases this on a belief that "Media concentration, because it results in an ever-decreasing number of sources of publicly available information, poses a serious threat to the development of an informed public."

Stephanie DeClerk of the Arkansas Law Review believed that the outcome of the case would force the FCC to take a look at heading in a different direction, saying: "Hopefully, the FCC will begin to recognize the drawbacks of media ownership deregulation and will begin to "create new media rules for the [twenty-first] century that foster diversity and protect local media".

Writing in Communication Law and Policy, David Pritchard, Christopher Terry and Paul R Brewer did not agree with the ruling, or the premises behind the Citizen Activist groups. In a series of studies, they found that the proprietors of the cross-ownerships in their study permitted their media outlets to publish and broadcast a diversity of viewpoints. What is more, the slant of news and opinion in non-cross-owned media was not significantly different from that of cross-owned media. At least in the context of newspaper-broadcast cross-ownership, such findings undermine the premise that each media owner constitutes a single voice on important subjects such as presidential elections.

Daniel Ho and Kevin Quinn wrote an article in the Federal Communications Law Journal showing that consolidation of the media industry is not the danger many report it to be. Their results show stability in viewpoints for three conglomerate acquisitions. "In short, consolidation does not inexorably lead to convergence or divergence. Our article purposely adopts a broad view of empirical inquiry as encompassing both quantitative and qualitative research."

Following court cases

Supreme Court
Following the decision of the Third Court of Appeals against them, the FCC and the United States filed for the case to be heard by Supreme Court. Federal Communications Commission and United States, Petitioners v. Prometheus Radio Project, et al. (No. 04-1168.) was decided on June 13, 2005. The petition for writ of certiorari to the US Court of Appeals for the Third Circuit was denied. The Supreme Court was made up of Justices Rehnquist, Stevens, O'Connor, Scalia, Kennedy, Souter, Thomas, Ginsburg, and Breyer at the time. Judge Breyer, however, did not take part in the decision or consideration of the petition.

Subsequent appeals
After the decision of the case, the FCC reevaluated all of the points that had been remanded. Following tweaks and modifications, along with justifying certain elements they had previously made, they returned to court to have the stay lifted.

In 2009, the Third Court of Appeals revisited the case on April 14 (Nos. 08-3078 et al.) With judges Scirica, Ambro, and Fuentes once again on the bench, the court granted the foregoing motion to hold cases in abeyance pending further order of the Court. The opinion was issued by Chief Judge Scirica, and ordered the parties to show cause within twenty-one days why the stay that was ordered by the court in the original case, as well as the 2004 main case, should not be lifted. The parties were ordered to electronically submit briefs to make their case.

On June 12 the court reconvened on the case. After considering the briefs issued to the court by all parties, the opinion of the court was that the stay would remain in effect, pending further order of the Court. The court asked the parties to issue status reports by October 1, 2009, including whether the stay should be lifted at that time. The Court asked that all parties also promptly advise the Court if any new developments arose that would be material to the case.

Reversal
After reviewing the status reports from previous cases, as well as additional reports in the interim, the Court met on March 23, 2010. During this session, the Court issued the opinion that after reviewing all updated information, the FCC had fulfilled its obligations on remanded portions, and the court decided to lift all stays entered by the court during the series of Prometheus Radio Project v. FCC cases. Under the schedule put forth by the court, Prometheus Radio Project and all intervenor petitioners had to file briefs by May 17, 2010. Thirty days after all petitioner briefs were received, the FCC was required to submit their brief. If necessary, Prometheus Radio Project had fourteen days following the FCC brief to file a reply brief. At that point the order of the court was to be considered final, and the stay on FCC media ownership rules fully lifted.

See also 
 Prometheus Radio Project
 Media ownership
 Media concentration
 Telecommunications Act of 1996
 Communications Act of 1934
 Media Market
 Federal Communications Commission

Notes

External links 

Prometheus Radio Project vs. FCC - Text of the suit
Q&A with Pete Tridish of Prometheus - Pete talks about the lawsuit
Fate of the Media Hangs in the Balance - Oral Arguments of Prometheus vs. FCC
Press Release - Prometheus press release regarding the Court's decision
Prometheus Radio Project - Official homepage
Federal Communications Commission - Official homepage

2004 in United States case law
Federal Communications Commission litigation
United States Court of Appeals case articles without infoboxes
United States Court of Appeals for the Third Circuit cases
Concentration of media ownership